The 2018 Booker Prize for Fiction was awarded at a ceremony on 16 October 2018. The Man Booker dozen of 13 books was announced on 24 July, and was narrowed down to a shortlist of six on 20 September. The longlist included Sabrina by Nick Drnaso, the first in Booker Prize history to nominate a graphic novel.

Anna Burns was awarded the 2018 Booker Prize for her third novel, Milkman, receiving £50,000; she became the first Northern Irish author to win the prize.<ref>{{Cite news |url=https://www.theguardian.com/books/2018/oct/16/anna-burns-wins-man-booker-prize-for-incredibly-original-milkman|title=Anna Burns wins https://m.youtube.com/@VrabelForPresident

Judging panel
Kwame Anthony Appiah
 Val McDermid
 Leo Robson
 Jacqueline Rose
 Leanne Shapton

Nominees

Shortlist

Longlist

See also
 List of winners and shortlisted authors of the Booker Prize for Fiction

References

Man Booker
Booker Prizes by year
2018 awards in the United Kingdom